Talkhab may refer to various places in Iran:

Bushehr Province
 Talkhab, Bushehr
 Talkhab-e Riz, Bushehr Province

East Azerbaijan Province
 Talkhab, East Azerbaijan, a village in Hashtrud County

Fars Province
 Talkhab, Doshman Ziari, a village in Mamasani County
 Talkhab, Mahvarmilani, a village in Mamasani County
 Talkhab-e Olya, Fars, a village in Rostam County
 Talkhab-e Sofla, a village in Rostam County

Ilam Province
 Talkhab, Dustan, Darreh Shahr County, Ilam Province
 Talkhab, Hendmini, Darreh Shahr County, Ilam Province

Kohgiluyeh and Boyer-Ahmad Province
 Talkhab-e Dishmuk, Kohgiluyeh and Boyer-Ahmad Province
 Talkhab-e Magher, Kohgiluyeh and Boyer-Ahmad Province
 Talkhab-e Olya, Kohgiluyeh and Boyer-Ahmad, Kohgiluyeh and Boyer-Ahmad Province
 Talkhab-e Shirin, Kohgiluyeh and Boyer-Ahmad Province
 Talkhab-e Sofla Bidak, Kohgiluyeh and Boyer-Ahmad Province

Khuzestan Province
 Talkhab, Izeh, Khuzestan Province
 Talkhab, Susan, Khuzestan Province
 Talkhab-e Ahmadi, Khuzestan Province
 Talkhab-e Hamzeh Ali, Khuzestan Province
 Talkhab-e Kalat, Khuzestan Province
 Talkhab-e Khun Ali, Khuzestan Province
 Talkhab-e Nazer, Khuzestan Province
 Talkhab-e Taj od Din, Khuzestan Province
 Talkhab-e Zardpatak, Khuzestan Province

Markazi Province
 Talkhab, Markazi, Markazi Province

Semnan Province
 Talkhab, Semnan

South Khorasan Province

West Azerbaijan Province
 Talkhab, West Azerbaijan, a village in Miandoab County

Zanjan Province
 Talkhab, Zanjan, a village in Zanjan County
 Talkhab, Zanjanrud, a village in Zanjan County

See also
 Talkh Ab (disambiguation), various places in Iran